Russlan Boukerou (born 16 December 1989) is an Algerian-French rugby union player. His position is Lock and he currently plays for Albi in the Federale 1.

References

1989 births
Living people
French rugby union players
People from Algiers
Stade Toulousain players
Rugby union locks
Algerian emigrants to France